The Tapestry of the Fundació is a tapestry made by Joan Miró and Josep Royo in 1979 and that is conserved in the Fundació Joan Miró, in Barcelona.

At the beginning of the 1970s Joan Miró began to collaborate with Josep Royo from an exhibition in Barcelona's Sala Gaspar. Miró began to produce sobreteixims, works that are halfway between painting, collage and tapestry. Later, following the assignment of the Great Tapestry of the World Trade Center and the Tapestry of the National Gallery of Washington, Miró decided to make another one for the Foundation that bears his name in Barcelona, specially conceived for the space where it would be installed. It has been on display at the same location since 1979, and it was conceived by Miró as a huge fresco.

See also 
 The World Trade Center Tapestry

References

Further reading 
 Fundació Joan Miró. Obra de Joan Miró: Pintura, escultura i sobreteixims a la col·lecció de la Fundació. Barcelona: Fundació Joan Miró; Polígrafa, 1979; ill. n. 348, p. 114 (col.), 178; cat. n. 348, p. 178
 Erben, Walter. Joan Miró 1893-1983: Mensch und Werk. Cologne: Taschen, 1988; ill. p. 240 (col.); p. 241-242
 Fundació Joan Miró. Obra de Joan Miró: Dibuixos, pintura, escultura, ceràmica, tèxtils. Barcelona: Fundació Joan Miró, 1988; ill. n. 1679, pp. 458–461
 Dupin, Jacques. Miró. Barcelona: Polígrafa, 1993; p. 402; p. 402, fig. n. 426, p. 403 (col.); p. 404-405
 Malet, Rosa Maria. Fundació Joan Miró: Guia. Barcelona: Fundació Joan Miró; Carroggio; Geneva: Skira, 1999; p. 91; p. 100, ill. p. 101 (col.)
 Joan Miró. Seville: Sala San Hermenegildo, 3–29 May 2005 ; Córdoba: Caja Sur. Sala de Exposiciones, 7 June-10 July 2005; p. 30; p. 30, fig. p. 31
 Juncosa Vecchierini, Patricia (ed.). Miró-Sert segons ells mateixos = Miró-Sert en sus propias palabras = Miró-Sert in their own words: Correspondència 1937-1980. Murcia: CENDEAC; Palma de Mallorca: Fundació Pilar i Joan Miró, 2008; p. 480, 484, 502-503
 Pou, Anna ; Romaguera, Mariona. Miró. Barcelona: Ciro, 2008. (Grans genis de l'Art a Catalunya); p. 31
 Clavero, Jordi. Fundació Joan Miró: Guia de la Fundació. Barcelona: Fundació Joan Miró; Polígrafa, 2010; p. 162; ill. p. 163 (col.)
 Guia de la Fundació Joan Miró. Barcelona: Fundació Joan Miró; Polígrafa, 2016 (Catalan, Spanish, English, French, Italian, German and Japanese editions); p. 154; p. 154, ill. p. 155 (col.)
 Joan Miró: Las obras de su vida. Barcelona: Dos de arte, 2016; ill. p. 106 (col.)

Culture in Barcelona
Joan Miró
1979 in art
Tapestries